M Venkataraju (1916-1969) was a music director/composer of Kannada cinema.

Filmography
List of films
Bhakta Kanakadasa (1960)
Raja Satyavrata (1961)
Swarna Gowri (1962)
Thejaswini (1962)
Sri Dharmasthala Mahathme (1962)
Nanda Deepa (1963)
Jeevana Tharanga (1963)
Chandra Kumara (In association with T.Chalapathi Rao) (1963)

References

External links

Kannada film score composers
1916 births
1969 deaths
Film musicians from Karnataka